Treasure House is the second album by London-based alternative rock duo Cat's Eyes, released on 3 June 2016 on the Kobalt Label Services record label.

Accolades

Track listing

References

2016 albums
Cat's Eyes albums